Fishing Bay is a large saltwater bay, located in Dorchester County, Maryland. From tributaries to its north in the Blackwater National Wildlife Refuge and Fishing Bay Wildlife Management Area, it flows south into the Chesapeake Bay. Its borders are formed by Elliot's Island, to the east, and the greater bulk of Dorchester County to the west.

References

Bays of Maryland
Bodies of water of Dorchester County, Maryland